Sand Key Light is a lighthouse  southwest of Key West, Florida, between Sand Key Channel and Rock Key Channel, two of the channels into Key West, on a reef intermittently covered by sand. At times the key has been substantial enough to have trees, and in 1900 nine to twelve thousand terns nested on the island. At other times the island has been washed away completely.

Early history
The first navigational light on Sand Key was a  brick tower built in 1827. After the first keeper, John Flaherty, died in 1830, his widow Rebecca took over the job. In 1844 a hurricane eroded part of the island, destroyed the keeper's house, and damaged the seawall. The 1846 Havana hurricane toppled the tower, killing the light keeper and five others.

Reconstructions and renovations
As the Key West Light had also been destroyed in the same storm, a ship, the Honey, was acquired and outfitted as a lightship to serve as the Sand Key Light until new lighthouses could be built. Due to efforts to reorganize the Lighthouse Board, Congress was slow to appropriate funds for the new lighthouses.

A screw-pile foundation for a new light on Sand Key was begun in 1852. Funds ran out before the foundation was complete, and the contractor had to wait seven years for final payment. Later that year Lieutenant George Meade, who had completed construction of the Carysfort Reef Light, was placed in charge of construction of the Sand Key Light. The light tower was completed in 1853. This light was the first to use the hydraulic lamp designed by George Meade.

The screw-pile foundation and open framework tower allowed the lighthouse to survive later hurricanes, including one in 1856 that completely washed away all of the island above water. The light was automated in 1938. In 1967 the first order Fresnel lens was removed and replaced by a fourth order lens. That in turn was removed in 1982 and replaced with a flash tube array. The tower was severely damaged in a fire in 1989, and the light was moved to a nearby temporary structure. An attempt was made to restore the structure of the tower in 1995, but the keeper's quarters were demolished in 1996. The light was returned to the tower in 1998.

Gallery

Notes

References

Further reading

External links 
 

Lighthouses completed in 1853
Houses completed in 1853
History of Key West, Florida
Lighthouses on the National Register of Historic Places in Florida
Lighthouses in Monroe County, Florida
National Register of Historic Places in Monroe County, Florida
Historic American Buildings Survey in Florida
1853 establishments in Florida